Meng Fei may refer to:

 Meng Fei (gymnast) (born 1981), Chinese female artistic gymnast
 Meng Fei (figure skater) (born 1985), Chinese male ice dancer
 Meng Fei (host), Chinese television show host
 Meng Fei (actor) Chinese Martial arts star and actor